Tall Tales is the full-length debut album by Canadian pop singer-songwriter Royal Wood, released in 2004.

Track listing
 "The Spirits and I"
 "Once"
 "Sway"
 "Suzanne"
 "Weigh Me Down"
 "Under the Years"
 "The Wonder"
 "The Scene"
 "The Roaming Sky"
 "Balloon"
 "A Perfect Ending"

2004 albums
Royal Wood albums